Fregolia listropteroides is a species of beetle in the family Cerambycidae, the only species in the genus Fregolia.

References

Callidiopini
Monotypic Cerambycidae genera